Karnataka State Film Award for Best Regional Film is a state film award of the Indian state of Karnataka  given during the annual Karnataka State Film Awards. The award honors the sub-sect of Kannada films.

Award winners
The following is a complete list of award winners and the name of the films for which they won.

See also
 Cinema of Karnataka
 List of Kannada-language films
 Tulu cinema

References

Karnataka State Film Awards
Kannada-language films
1996 establishments in Karnataka